Lloyd Vernon Kennedy (March 20, 1907 – January 28, 1993) was an American Major League Baseball pitcher with the Chicago White Sox, Detroit Tigers, St. Louis Browns, Washington Senators, Cleveland Indians, Philadelphia Phillies and Cincinnati Reds. Kennedy batted left-handed and threw right-handed. He was born in Kansas City, Missouri. Kennedy attended college at what is now known as the University of Central Missouri, where the football field bears his name.

While pitching for the Chicago White Sox, Kennedy threw the first no-hitter in Comiskey Park, a 5–0 shutout over Cleveland on August 31, 1935. His most productive season came in 1936, when he posted career-highs in
wins (21), innings pitched and  complete games (20). A competent hitting-pitcher, he compiled a .244 average (181-for-743) with 36 extra base hits, including four home runs and 61 RBI. He also made the American League All-Star team in 1936 and 1938. In a 12-season career, Kennedy posted a 104–132 record with 691 strikeouts and a 4.67 ERA in  innings.

Kennedy died in Mendon, Missouri, at the age of 85 after a shed (smokehouse) roof collapsed on him.

See also
 List of Major League Baseball no-hitters

References

External links

1907 births
1993 deaths
American League All-Stars
Chicago White Sox players
Cincinnati Reds players
Cleveland Indians players
Detroit Tigers players
Philadelphia Phillies players
St. Louis Browns players
Washington Senators (1901–1960) players
Major League Baseball pitchers
Baseball players from Kansas City, Missouri
Accidental deaths in Missouri